MIBA Aviation was a cargo airline based in the Democratic Republic of the Congo. It was established and started operations in 1994 and was an ad hoc and charter cargo operator.

Fleet 
The MIBA Aviation fleet included the following aircraft in April 2008:
1 Boeing 727-100F

See also		
 Transport in the Democratic Republic of the Congo

References

External links
MIBA Aviation Fleet

Defunct airlines of the Democratic Republic of the Congo
Airlines established in 1994
Defunct cargo airlines
1994 establishments in Zaire